The court case of the Babiniotis Dictionary was fought in Greece over the legality of the publication of a Modern Greek dictionary that included a definition of the word "Bulgarian" (referring to a person or persons).

George Babiniotis, professor of linguistics at Athens University, managed the publication of a dictionary in 1998, named Dictionary of Modern Greek, more commonly known as Babiniotis Dictionary. The dictionary was published by the Lexicology Centre.

For the word "Bulgarian" the dictionary provided a dual definition, first its normal use referring to persons descended from Bulgaria, and second a definition marked as vulgar and derogatory to denote a fan of PAOK football team.

On 23 May 1998 a person took legal action asking for the second definition to be deleted. The courts accepted the case with number 18134/1998 and agreed that the obscene definition had no place in a dictionary, so the publisher had to delete the second definition from every unsold copy of the dictionary or otherwise it couldn't be legally sold anymore. This was criticized by some people, including some law professors, and later the court case was reviewed by a higher court. On 22 April 1999 the higher court, with case number 13/1999, decided to overturn the decision of the lower court.

1998 in Greece
1998 in law